The Utah Valley wrestling team represents Utah Valley University in Orem, Utah. The team is coached by 10th year head coach Greg Williams. The team competes in the Big 12 Conference, as the school's primary conference (the Western Athletic Conference) does not sponsor wrestling.

History
Utah Valley University's wrestling team remained a member of the Western Wrestling Conference (WWC) through the 2014–15 school year. The WWC then disbanded when all of its members accepted an offer of single-sport membership in the Big 12 Conference.

All-Americans 
Utah Valley has had 4 All-Americans in the history of the program.

References

 
College sports in Utah
Big 12 Conference wrestling